Elissa Cunane (born September 25, 2000) is an American professional basketball player. She played college basketball at NC State. She was drafted by the Seattle Storm in the 2022 WNBA Draft.

College career

Freshman season
Cunane came off the bench in her freshman season for majority of the season while also coming back from a foot fracture she suffered in high school. Despite being a bench player, she often played in late-game situations and was a key player towards the end of the Wolfpack's season, starting after an injury to regular starter Erika Cassell.

Sophomore season
Cunane started 31 of the 32 games she appeared in, averaging a near double-double as she also earned third-team All-American honors. She also set a NC State single-season record for most made free throws with 159.

Junior season
In her junior season, Cunane started all 23 games she appeared in, despite missing a month recovering from COVID-19. In her return, she put up 16 points and 6 rebounds in a 74–60 win against No. 1 ranked Louisville.

Senior season
Cunane enters her senior season as one of the top prospects in the 2022 WNBA draft.

College statistics

National team career
Cunane represented the United States at the 2021 FIBA AmeriCup, where they won gold. She was named to the AmeriCup's All-Star team after averaging 12.8 points and eight rebounds during the tournament.

Professional career
Cunane was drafted by the Seattle Storm in the second round. She was cut after playing in two preseason games.

Minnesota Lynx
Cunane signed a hardship contract with the Lynx on May 31, 2022. She made her WNBA debut on June 1, 2022, against the Atlanta Dream. On June 21, 2022, Cunane was released from her hardship contract. She appeared in 3 games for the Lynx.

WNBA career statistics

Regular Season

|-
| align="left" | 2022
| align="left" | Minnesota
| 3 || 0 || 3.3 || .500 || .000 || .000 || 1.7 || 0.0 || 0.0 || 0.0 || 0.3 || 0.7
|-
| align="left" | Career
| align="left" | 1 year, 1 team
| 3 || 0 || 3.3 || .500 || .000 || .000 || 1.7 || 0.0 || 0.0 || 0.0 || 0.3 || 0.7

Personal life
Cunane is the daughter of Dan and Sharon Cunane and sister to older sibling William Paul. Dan is a former Greensboro police sergeant who suffered an injury in a bicycle accident when Elissa was two, initially paralyzing him from the neck down. He has since regained some use of his lower body and arms, but still uses a wheelchair to get around.

References

External links
 
 NC State Wolfpack bio
 USA Basketball bio

2000 births
Living people
All-American college women's basketball players
Basketball players from North Carolina
Centers (basketball)
LGBT basketball players
LGBT people from North Carolina
Lesbian sportswomen
People from Summerfield, North Carolina
Power forwards (basketball)
NC State Wolfpack women's basketball players
Seattle Storm draft picks
Minnesota Lynx players